Alloeorhynchus trimacula is a species of damsel bug in the family Nabidae. It is found in Central America and North America.

References

Further reading

 
 

Nabidae
Articles created by Qbugbot
Insects described in 1857